The Beardsley-Oliver House is a historic house located at 312 Laurel Avenue in Olean, Cattaraugus County, New York.

Description and history 
It is a -story, wood-framed dwelling built in about 1890. It exhibits a late Victorian blending of Shingle Style and Queen Anne styles.

It was listed on the National Register of Historic Places on February 28, 2008.

References

Houses on the National Register of Historic Places in New York (state)
Houses completed in 1890
Houses in Cattaraugus County, New York
National Register of Historic Places in Cattaraugus County, New York